Carroll Elmer "Deacon" Jones (December 20, 1892 in Arcadia, Kansas – December 28, 1952 in Pittsburg, Kansas), was a professional baseball player who played pitcher in the Major Leagues from –. He played for the Detroit Tigers.

External links

1892 births
1952 deaths
Major League Baseball pitchers
Detroit Tigers players
Baseball players from Kansas
Topeka Jayhawks players
Clinton Pilots players
Portland Beavers players
Sacramento Senators players